Michel-Ange–Auteuil is a station of the Paris Métro in the 16th arrondissement, serving as an interchange between line 9 and line 10 (westbound only). It is named after the nearby rue Michel-Ange, which was in turn named after Michelangelo (the nearby Michel-Ange—Molitor station was also named after him) as well as the nearby rue Auteuil, which was named after the former village of Auteuil (it used to be its main street). The Embassy of the Central African Republic is located nearby.

History
The station opened on 30 September 1913 when line 8 was extended from Beaugrenelle (now Charles Michels) to Porte d'Auteuil. Line 9's platforms opened on 8 November 1922 with the opening of the initial section of the line from Trocadéro to Exelmans. On 27 July 1937, the section of line 8 between La Motte-Picquet–Grenelle and Porte d'Auteuil, including Michel-Ange–Auteuil was transferred to line 10 during the reconfiguration of lines 8, 10, and the old line 14. However, service between Porte d'Auteuil and Jussieu was not provided until two days later on July 29, with service initially limited to La Motte-Picquet-Grenelle.

As part of the "Renouveau du métro" programme by the RATP, the station's corridors and lights were renovated and modernised on 6 December 2002.

In 2019, the station was used by 2,042,174 passengers, making it the 243rd busiest of the Métro network out of 302 stations.

In 2020, the station was used by 1,131,814 passengers amidst the COVID-19 pandemic, making it the 230th busiest of the Métro network out of 305 stations.

In 2021, the station was used by 1,512,050 passengers, making it the 233rd busiest of the Métro network out of 305 stations.

Passenger services

Access 
The station has 2 accesses:

 Access 1: place Jean-Lorrain (with a rare Val d'Osne totem)
 Access 2: rue d'Auteuil (with an ascending escalator)

Station layout

Platforms 
Line 9's station have a standard configuration with 2 tracks surrounded by 2 side platforms whereas line 10's station has a uncommon configuration. Similar to line 10's platforms at Michel-Ange–Molitor, it has two tracks flanking a single island platform. Only the southern track is used for regular commercial use for traffic towards Porte d'Auteuil. The other track, however, is fenced off on the platform and leads to a connection to line 9.

Other connections 
The station also served by lines 52 and 62 (only in the direction of Porte de France) of the RATP bus network.

Gallery

References

Roland, Gérard (2003). Stations de métro. D’Abbesses à Wagram. Éditions Bonneton.

Paris Métro stations in the 16th arrondissement of Paris
Railway stations in France opened in 1913
Paris Métro line 9
Paris Métro line 10